Communist Workers Party was an Austrian council communist party. It was founded in 1924, and was modelled after the Communist Workers Party of Germany. Its political influence was however very limited. The party publication was printed in Berlin, and the group had only a handful of members. The party disappeared soon after its formation.

References

Defunct political parties in Austria
Political parties established in 1924
1924 establishments in Austria
Council communism
Left communist organizations
Libertarian socialist parties